Nina Arsenault (born January 20, 1974) is a Canadian performance artist, freelance writer, and former sex worker who works in theatre, dance, video, photography and visual art.

Early life 
Arsenault grew up in a trailer park in Beamsville, Ontario. She has two master's degrees. At one point prior to her transition, Arsenault was an instructor at York University, where she taught acting.

She has said she realized that she was a trans woman in August 1996 and her transition was in full force around 1998. By 2007 she had undergone over $150,000 in surgery during her transition, financed through work in the sex trade as a web cam girl, a stripper and a self-described "hooker [performing oral sex only]".

Career 
Arsenault wrote a regular column on transgender issues for 36 issues of fab, a biweekly Toronto-based LGBT magazine. Her last column was in early 2007.

She has appeared on the television series Train 48 and KinK, as well as the Showtime movie Soldier's Girl.

She had a well-publicized encounter with Tommy Lee where he flirted with Arsenault for some time before discovering that Arsenault was transgender, and subsequently left in a hurry.

Arsenault appeared in a one-act play written especially for her by Sky Gilbert in November 2007 entitled Ladylike. She also wrote her own one woman show called The Silicone Diaries, directed by Buddies in Bad Times Artistic Director Brendan Healy, which toured across Canada to sold-out houses and critical praise.

She appeared also in The Jon Dore Television Show, appearing the episode "Manly Man". She stated the reason why she does not want to remove her current genitals:

In 2010, she performed an autobiographical play entitled i was Barbie.

In 2012, she performed for 40 Days and 40 Nights as part of the inaugural SummerWorks Live Art series in Toronto.  For this performance, she spent 40 days undergoing a spiritual experience and opened the last 11 days to the public.  As part of this performance, she spent two hours a night whipping herself while riding an exercise bike.  She has also performed For Every Time You Shattered Me I Made Myself Again, a six-hour performance in The Henry Moore Sculpture Room at The Art Gallery of Ontario where she appeared in a myriad of different personas live and onscreen, dressing, undressing and washing herself with a number of unspecified fluids in front of the audience.

In 2013, at London's performance space she lived inside an art gallery for six days for a work called Lillex.  Here, with UK artist Poppy Jackson, Arsenault performed rituals which explored feminine mythology as well as virtuality, including a trance-like dance which would often continue for six hours at a time.  During these dances she was repeatedly burned with cigarettes on her chest, neck, breasts and occasionally above the genitals, and appeared unaffected by pain.

Her photographic and video collaborations with artists like Bruce LaBruce, John Greyson, Jordan Tannahill, and Istvan Kantor have been shown across Canada and around the world via film and video festivals, academic and art journals and galleries including the Museum of Contemporary Canadian Art, Pleasuredome, FADO and New York University.

Arsenault has been a frequent guest speaker at universities in Canada and The United States as well as intellectual conferences like Moses Znaimer's Ideacity.  She has also worked as a social activist promoting the rights and dignity of trans people with The Toronto Police Service, Mount Sinai Hospital, Women's College Hospital, The Sherbourne Health Centre, Supporting Our Youth, and The 519 Church Street Community Centre.

In 2013, Arsenault joined MAU, a New Zealand company of contemporary performance led by Lemi Ponifasio.  Her first work with MAU is called The Crimson House and is scheduled for a world tour in 2014 and beyond. In the same year, she had a supporting role in Greyson's web series Murder in Passing.

Arsenault's life and work are the subject of the book Trans(per)forming Nina Arsenault - An Unreasonable Body of Work, edited by Judith Rudakoff, published in April 2012.

Personal life 
Arsenault dated Canadian killer and alleged cannibal Luka Magnotta around 2002 before his notoriety for violent crimes. She says that Magnotta was obsessed with wanting to be famous, and that he made disturbing comments about injuring kittens when they dated. She has said that she believes that the murders he is alleged to have committed were done as a result of, and under the influence of, drugs.

References

External links 

 
 Arsenault's first column at Fab Magazine
 

Canadian columnists
Canadian transgender writers
Living people
People from the Regional Municipality of Niagara
Actresses from Ontario
Journalists from Ontario
Writers from Ontario
Canadian female prostitutes
1974 births
Canadian women journalists
Transgender artists
Canadian women columnists
Canadian stage actresses
Canadian web series actresses
21st-century Canadian actresses
Transgender actresses
21st-century Canadian dramatists and playwrights
Canadian women dramatists and playwrights
21st-century Canadian women writers
Canadian women non-fiction writers
21st-century Canadian LGBT people